"Tic Toc" is the lead single released from the Lords of the Underground's second album, Keepers of the Funk. Produced by Marley Marl, with the group's DJ Lord Jazz providing scratches, "Tic Toc" was the Lords' last single to reach the Billboard Hot 100, peaking at 73 on that chart, while also making it to 17 on the Hot Rap Singles chart. The song samples Doug E. Fresh and Slick Rick's "La Di Da Di".

Single track listing

A-Side
"Tic Toc" (Rumble Mix)- 3:53
"Tic Toc" (TV Mix)- 3:53
"Tic Toc" (Acapella)- 3:53

B-Side
"Tic Toc" (Remix)- 4:45
"Tic Toc" (TV Remix)- 4:45
"Tic Toc" (Rumblin' Instrumental)- 3:53

Charts

1994 singles
Lords of the Underground songs
1994 songs
Song recordings produced by Marley Marl